McLennan Reservation is a nature reserve located in Otis and Tyringham, Massachusetts.  The property is owned by The Trustees of Reservations through a series of endowments for preserving the land, the first in 1977. The reservation is adjacent to another Trustees property, Ashintully Gardens.

See also
Ashintully Gardens

References

External links 
 The Trustees of Reservations: McLennan Reservation

The Trustees of Reservations
Open space reserves of Massachusetts
Protected areas of Berkshire County, Massachusetts
Protected areas established in 1977
1977 establishments in Massachusetts
Tyringham, Massachusetts